The 2021 season was the Green Bay Packers' 101st season in the National Football League (NFL), their 103rd overall and their third under head coach Matt LaFleur.

With a Week 15 win over the Baltimore Ravens, the Packers won the NFC North for the third consecutive year. With their victory over the Minnesota Vikings in Week 17, they earned home field advantage, a first round bye, and the No. 1 seed in the NFC playoffs. They also became the first team in NFL history to finish three consecutive seasons with 13 or more wins. Aaron Rodgers was also named MVP for the fourth time and the second year in a row.

However, their season came to an abrupt end for the third time in a row, with a 13–10 upset loss to the underdog San Francisco 49ers in the Divisional Round; this marked the Packers' fourth loss against the 49ers in the postseason and in the divisional round of the NFC playoffs since Aaron Rodgers became the starting quarterback, with it also being their second home divisional loss in the Rodgers era. This also meant the Packers only won a total of two playoff games between these three thirteen-win seasons.

While the Packers were able to clinch the top-seed and clinching the NFC’s best record, the Packers special teams received scrutiny during the entire season as they were ranked 32nd in the NFL by the Football Outsiders DVOA, Packer Central, and Sports Illustrated writer Rick Gosselin. This special teams unit was one of the primary reasons why the Packers lost in the NFC Divisional Game to the 49ers. Following the loss to the 49ers, Maurice Drayton was fired as special teams coordinator.

Player movements

Trades

Free agents

Additions

Subtractions

Retirements

Draft

Notes/Trades

Undrafted free agent additions

Roster cuts
The roster was cut to 53 on August 31, 2021.

Staff

Final roster

Preseason
The Packers' preseason opponents and schedule were announced on May 12.

Regular season

Schedule
The first week was announced 11 hours ahead of the rest of the season on May 12.

Note: Intra-division opponents are in bold text.

Game summaries

Week 1: at New Orleans Saints
The Packers start off their season with a 35-point loss to the New Orleans Saints. This took place in Jacksonville due to expected power outages to the Superdome.

Week 2: vs. Detroit Lions

Week 3: at San Francisco 49ers

Week 4: vs. Pittsburgh Steelers

This was the Packers' first regular season win against the Steelers since Week 17 in 1995, and their first win against them overall since Week 2 of the 2018 Preseason.

Week 5: at Cincinnati Bengals

Week 6: at Chicago Bears

Week 7: vs. Washington Football Team

Week 8: at Arizona Cardinals

The Packers handed the previously undefeated Cardinals their first loss of the season following a game-ending interception by cornerback Rasul Douglas.

Week 9: at Kansas City Chiefs

This was the Packers' first loss since Week 1 against the Saints, as star QB Aaron Rodgers missed this game due to contracting COVID-19.

Week 10: vs. Seattle Seahawks

Week 11: at Minnesota Vikings

Week 12: vs. Los Angeles Rams

The Packers held off the Rams in their home in Lambeau Field. After the Rams would score to make it 20 - 17, the Packers would take a lead they would never surrender, scoring 16 unanswered points in the process to improve to 9 - 3.

Week 14: vs. Chicago Bears

Week 15: at Baltimore Ravens

Week 16: vs. Cleveland Browns
Christmas Day game

Aaron Rodgers surpassed Brett Favre with his 443rd touchdown pass to Allen Lazard.

Week 17: vs. Minnesota Vikings

The game was the coldest of the NFL season, with a game-time temperature of 11 degrees Fahrenheit, and a wind chill of 1 degree Fahrenheit. With the win, Green Bay clinched the #1 seed in the NFC for the second straight year, and their 3rd straight 13-win season.

Week 18: at Detroit Lions

Standings

Division

Conference

Postseason

As the result of clinching the NFC North division title and the best record in the NFC, the Packers hosted a playoff game in the Divisional round.

Game summaries

NFC Divisional Playoffs: vs. (6) San Francisco 49ers

Despite leading 10–3 throughout most of the game, the Packers went on to lose 13–10 to the 49ers. During the game, the special teams received scrutiny after allowing a blocked field goal, a 32-yard kick return by JaMycal Hasty, a 45-yard return by Deebo Samuel, and blocked punt that would tie the game at 10–10 in the 4th quarter. Prior to the game, the special teams was scrutinized during the entire season as they were ranked 32nd in the NFL DVOA by football outsiders.

Statistics

Starters

Regular season

Offense

Defense

Postseason

Offense

Defense

Team leaders

League rankings

Awards

Notes

References

External links

Green Bay
Green Bay Packers seasons
Green Bay Packers
NFC North championship seasons